Martinapis luteicornis, the yellow-horned morning long-horned bee, is a species of long-horned bee in the family Apidae. It is found in Central America and North America.

References

Further reading

External links

 

Apinae
Articles created by Qbugbot
Insects described in 1896